Galium orizabense (bald bedstraw) is a species of plants in the family Rubiaceae, named for the town of Orizaba in Veracruz, where the first collections of the species were made. The species is native to Mexico (from Sinaloa + Nuevo León south to Oaxaca), Costa Rica, Guatemala, Panamá, Venezuela, Colombia, and Hispaniola, plus widely scattered locations in the southeastern United States.

Subspecies
Two subspecies are recognized (May 2014).
Galium orizabense subsp. laevicaule (Weath. & Blake) Dempster - United States and Hispaniola
Galium orizabense subsp. orizabense - Mexico, Central America, South America

References

External links
Photo of herbarium specimen at Missouri Botanical Garden, collected in Sinaloa in 1970, Galium orizabense
Photo of herbarium specimen at Field Museum in Chicago, collected in Panamá
Gardening Europe

orizabense
Flora of North America
Flora of Venezuela
Flora of Colombia
Flora of Central America
Plants described in 1880